Mazraeh Hamati (also Romanized as Mazra‘eh Hamatī) is a village in Howmeh Rural District, in the Central District of Maneh and Samalqan County, North Khorasan Province, Iran. At the 2006 census, its population was 14, in 6 families.

References 

Populated places in Maneh and Samalqan County